Viš is a small village in the municipality of Danilovgrad, Montenegro.

Demographics
According to the 2011 census, its population was 125.

References

Populated places in Danilovgrad Municipality